Francesca Bertoni (born 29 December 1993) is an Italian female 3000 metres steeplechaseer.

Biography
She was 4th in 3000m steeplechase race, with her personal best 9:43.80 at 2017 European Team Championships Super League.

Achievements

National titles
 Italian Athletics Championships
 3000 m steeplechase: 2016, 2017

See also
 Italian all-time lists - 3000 metres steeplechase

References

External links
 

1993 births
Living people
Italian female steeplechase runners
World Athletics Championships athletes for Italy
Athletes (track and field) at the 2018 Mediterranean Games
Sportspeople from Modena
Competitors at the 2017 Summer Universiade
Mediterranean Games competitors for Italy